Stefan Kohn (born 9 October 1965) is a German former professional footballer who played as a striker.

Honours
Werder Bremen
 UEFA Cup Winners' Cup: 1991–92
 Bundesliga: 1992–93

Individual
 Goal of the Year (Germany): 1986

References

External links
 

1965 births
Living people
People from Ellwangen
Sportspeople from Stuttgart (region)
Association football forwards
German footballers
Germany under-21 international footballers
German expatriate footballers
Bundesliga players
2. Bundesliga players
Ligue 2 players
Arminia Bielefeld players
Bayer 04 Leverkusen players
Hannover 96 players
VfL Bochum players
SV Werder Bremen players
1. FC Köln players
FC Schalke 04 players
OGC Nice players
SG Wattenscheid 09 players
Expatriate footballers in France
Footballers from Baden-Württemberg
German expatriate sportspeople in France